Sooriyawewa is a town in Sri Lanka. It is located in Hambantota District of Southern Province, Sri Lanka. Mahinda Rajapaksa International Stadium is situated here.

EWIS has set up Sri Lanka's first PC manufacturing plant – at Sooriyawewa.

Notable people
Nimali Liyanarachchi, runner, was born here in 1989.

References 

Populated places in Southern Province, Sri Lanka